Henry Lovel (or Lovell), 8th Baron Morley (died 1489) was an English peer and translator, Lord of Morley, Hingham, Hockering, &c., in Norfolk.

He was the son of Alianore Lovel, 7th Baroness Morley née de Morley (1442–1476) and husband Sir William Lovel, 7th Baron Morley (d. 1476), who was Baron Morley in her right.

He married Lady Elizabeth de la Pole (c. 1468 – aft. 1489), daughter of John de la Pole, 2nd Duke of Suffolk and wife Elizabeth Plantagenet, sister of Edward IV and Richard III, but had no children from this marriage. He was succeeded by his sister Alice Parker, 9th Baroness Morley, née Lovel (c. 1467–1518).

15th-century births
1489 deaths
People of the Tudor period
15th-century English people
Barons Morley